Freston may refer to:
 Freston, Suffolk, a village south of Ipswich, England
 An alternative name for Friston, a village near Saxmundham, Suffolk, England

People 
Anthony Freston (1757–1819), English Anglican clergyman
Kathy Freston, American self-help author
Tom Freston, American television executive

See also
 Freeston (disambiguation)
 Frestonia